Jacob Z. Sullum (born September 5, 1965) is a syndicated newspaper columnist with Creators Syndicate and a senior editor at Reason magazine. He focuses most of his writings on shrinking the realm of politics and expanding individual choice.  He was interviewed in the 2004 documentary Super Size Me.

Sullum is a native of Wilkes-Barre, Pennsylvania.

Career
Sullum writes a weekly column distributed nationally. He has contributed essays to The Wall Street Journal, USA Today, The New York Times, the Los Angeles Times, the San Francisco Chronicle, Cigar Aficionado, and National Review, among many others.

Sullum has been a frequent guest on many TV and radio programs. He has appeared on Fox News Channel, CNN, The O'Reilly Factor, Hardball, Paula Zahn Now, The Charlie Rose Show, and NPR while also speaking at the International Conference on Drug Policy Reform and the Conference on Computers, Freedom, and Privacy.

When Sullum first joined Reason in 1989, he was an assistant editor. He eventually worked his way up to becoming an associate editor and managing editor. He previously worked as an editor for National Review and a reporter for the News and Courier/Evening Post in Charleston, South Carolina.

Personal
Sullum obtained his degree from Cornell University, where he majored in economics and psychology. During his time in schools, he was an editor and columnist for The Cornell Daily Sun. He is a fellow of the Knight Center for Specialized Journalism. Sullum is married and together they have three daughters and two dogs. The family resides in Dallas, Texas.

Views
Sullum is for a non-interventionist foreign policy and has defended then-presidential candidate Ron Paul stating that it is inaccurate to call him an isolationist. Sullum has also made the case that Presidents, including 45th U.S. President Donald Trump, have been reckless with the lives of soldiers.

Awards and honors
Over the span of his career, Sullum's work has won a handful of awards which include:
 Thomas S. Szasz Award – 2004
 Sullum won the Keystone Press Award for investigative reporting – 1988
 First Prize in the Felix Morley Memorial Journalism Competition – 1991
 National Magazine Award for his Reason cover story about treating pain – 1998
 Drug Policy Alliance's Edward M. Brecher Award for Achievement in the Field of Journalism – 2005
 Won first place for commentary or feature in the Southern California Journalism Awards for "Thank Deng Xiaoping for Little Girls"  – 2007

Bibliography
 For Your Own Good:  The Anti-Smoking Crusade and the Tyranny of Public Health (1998)
 Saying Yes:  In Defense of Drug Use (2003), in which he puts forward the term voodoo pharmacology, a hotly debated subject.

References

External links
 Reason Online
 Biography at Reason Online
 
 Jacob Sullum Features at Creators Syndicate
 Archive at townhall.com
 Podcasts of Sullum's recent articles 

1965 births
Living people
20th-century American journalists
20th-century American male writers
20th-century American non-fiction writers
21st-century American journalists
21st-century American male writers
21st-century American non-fiction writers
Jack M. Barrack Hebrew Academy alumni
American columnists
American libertarians
American male journalists
American male non-fiction writers
American online journalists
American political writers
Anti-psychiatry
Cornell University alumni
Jewish American journalists
Jewish American writers
Journalists from Pennsylvania
Non-interventionism
American opinion journalists
Writers from Wilkes-Barre, Pennsylvania
21st-century American Jews